Michael Cody (born 20 June 1997) is an Irish hurler who plays for Kilkenny Intermediate Championship club Dunnamaggin and at inter-county level with the Kilkenny senior hurling team. He usually lines out as a right corner-back.

Career statistics

Honours

St. Kieran's College
All-Ireland Colleges Senior Hurling Championship (2): 2014, 2015
Leinster Colleges Senior Hurling Championship (1): 2015

Dunnamaggin
All-Ireland Junior Club Hurling Championship (1): 2019
Leinster Junior Club Hurling Championship (1): 2018
Kilkenny Junior Hurling Championship (1): 2018

Kilkenny
Leinster Under-21 Hurling Championship (1): 2017
Leinster Minor Hurling Championship (1): 2015

References

1997 births
Living people
Dunnamaggin hurlers
Kilkenny inter-county hurlers